Kälbersteine is a mountain in the district of Bautzen, Saxony. It is a member of the Lusatian Mountains and is located roughly a km south of Crostau.

Geography 
The mountain summit consists of a small granite outcrop, located 205 meters above the valley floor. The majority of the mountains woodland is spruce, although red beech, sycamore and English Oak are also occasionally seen.

Mountains of Saxony
Lusatian Highlands